Haidea (minor planet designation: 368 Haidea) is a large asteroid residing in the asteroid belt. It was discovered by Auguste Charlois on 19 May 1893 in Nice.

References

External links
 
 

Background asteroids
Haidea
Haidea
D-type asteroids (Tholen)
18930519